Chłopicki is Polish surname:
 Józef Grzegorz Chłopicki, Nieczuja coat-of-arms (1771–1854)
 Regina Chłopicka, née Rudnicka (born 1934), Polish female music theoretician
  (1894–1980)

References